How to Get Away with Murder is an American legal drama thriller television series that premiered on ABC on September 25, 2014, and concluded on May 14, 2020. The series was created by Peter Nowalk, and produced by Shonda Rhimes and ABC Studios. The series aired on ABC as part of a night of programming, all under Rhimes's Shondaland production company.

Viola Davis stars as Annalise Keating, a defense attorney and law professor at a prestigious Philadelphia university who, along with five of her students, becomes entangled in a murder plot. The series features an ensemble cast with Alfred Enoch, Jack Falahee, Aja Naomi King, Matt McGorry, and Karla Souza as Annalise's students, Charlie Weber and Liza Weil as her employees, and Billy Brown as a detective with the Philadelphia Police Department who is Annalise's lover. From the third season onward, Conrad Ricamora was promoted to the main cast after recurring heavily in the first two seasons.

For her performance, Davis received critical acclaim; she became the first black woman to win the Primetime Emmy Award for Outstanding Lead Actress in a Drama Series, also winning two Screen Actors Guild Awards for Outstanding Performance by a Female Actor in a Drama Series, and the Image Award for Outstanding Actress in a Drama Series. Davis has also received nominations from the Golden Globe Awards for Best Actress in a Television Series, the Critics' Choice Awards for Best Actress in a Drama Series, and the Television Critics Association at the TCA Awards for Individual Achievement in Drama.

Other cast members also received recognition for their performances, with Enoch and King receiving nominations from the NAACP Image Awards for Outstanding Supporting Actor in a Drama Series and Outstanding Supporting Actress in a Drama Series at the 2014 NAACP Image Awards ceremony. The series also received a GLAAD Media Award for Outstanding Drama Series.

Series overview

Season 1 (2014–15) 

Annalise Keating is a prominent criminal defense attorney and law professor at Middleton University in Philadelphia. She selects five of her first year students to intern at her firm: Wes Gibbins, Connor Walsh, Michaela Pratt, Asher Millstone, and Laurel Castillo (The Keating 5). They work with Annalise's employees, Frank Delfino and Bonnie Winterbottom, an associate lawyer. As the first season introduces occasional clients for Keating, it explores two related murders through both flashback and flashforward sequences: Lila Stangard, mistress of Annalise's husband and a student at Middleton, and then Sam Keating, Annalise's husband, who was killed by Annalise's interns.

The first nine episodes alternate between the present-day timeline in medias res, depicting Wes, Connor, Michaela, and Laurel covering up Sam's murder by disposing of his body, and flashbacks detailing the course of events leading up to Sam's death, including Annalise's becoming involved in the Lila Stangard investigation, at Wes' urging, leading her to discover Sam's affair and creating suspicion that he killed Lila. The final six episodes explore Annalise's attempt to help her interns cover up Sam's murder and legally implicate Sam in Lila's death, and flashbacks to Lila's final moments before her murder.

Season 2 (2015–16)

The first nine episodes focus on Annalise's defense of Caleb and Catherine Hapstall, who are accused of torturing and murdering their adoptive parents. Wes, in the meantime, teams up with Rebecca's foster brother to try and find Rebecca. Connor struggles with his relationship with Oliver, while Asher works with assistant district attorney Emily Sinclair, in order to protect his secrets. In the mid-season finale, Sinclair is murdered by Asher, and Annalise helps cover it up, at the expense of her being shot in the stomach by Wes.

The second part of the season focuses on Wes's investigation of his mother's suicide ten years prior; flashbacks reveal Annalise's involvement with Wes's mother's suicide. The season ends with Annalise's finding out that Frank was responsible for the car accident that killed her baby, and Annalise sending him away. Michaela and Asher hook up, and Wes meets with his biological father right before the latter is shot dead by an unknown shooter.

Season 3 (2016–17) 

In the aftermath of Wallace Mahoney's death, all five of the students attempt to move on. A new mystery arises around the burning down of Annalise's house and who was found dead inside. The events leading up to it involve Annalise's starting a free legal clinic and struggling with alcoholism. Oliver starts working for Annalise, and he leaves Connor when becoming disgusted with himself for rejecting Connor's Stanford acceptance. Michaela and Asher's romantic relationship starts to progress, as does Wes and Laurel's, and Frank starts working to atone for the death of Annalise's child. Ultimately, it is revealed that it was Wes who died, and that he was killed before the fire. Annalise is arrested for Wes's death. Frank attempts to help Annalise by confessing to killing Wes. It is further revealed that Wes's death was commissioned by Laurel's father, who disapproved of their relationship.

Season 4 (2017–18)

In the fourth season, Annalise works with a therapist, Dr. Isaac Roa, to see through her recovery from alcoholism. She initially cuts ties with Bonnie (who moves to the DA's office as an assistant district attorney reporting to DA Todd Denver) and the interns, gets a woman with a long rap sheet freed from jail, and then commits to a major class action against the state for miscarriages of justice caused by an underfunded public defender's office. Laurel deduces that her father, Jorge Castillo, is responsible for Wes's murder and hatches a scheme to steal incriminating evidence from his law firm with the help of Michaela, Oliver, Frank, and Asher. During the data heist, their classmate Simon (Behzad Dabu) accidentally shoots himself with Laurel's gun, leading to Asher's arrest, and Laurel goes into premature labor after being accidentally struck by Frank. Annalise successfully saves the baby. However, Jorge claims custody of his grandchild by submitting evidence of Laurel's past addictions and history of mental illness to a judge. Laurel's mother arrives unexpectedly to "help" Laurel fight against her father, and Frank and Bonnie uncover a mysterious link between Laurel's mother and both Wes and his killer, Dominic. Meanwhile, Annalise searches for alternative ways to win her class action lawsuit. On January 3, 2018, a crossover with Scandal was announced which aired on March 1, 2018.

Season 5 (2018–19)

On May 11, 2018, ABC renewed the series for a fifth season, which premiered on September 27, 2018.

After Annalise's class-action victory in the Supreme Court, she and her associates seek to start a new chapter in their lives. Annalise starts working at Caplan & Gold so she can use their resources for her class-action cases, while also working back at Middleton. Connor, Michaela, Asher and Laurel begin their third year at law school, and a new student, Gabriel Maddox joins the group on Annalise's class. Meanwhile, Frank tries to find out the real reason Maddox came to Middleton in the first place, and Asher joins Bonnie at the DA's office as he gets an internship there. At the same time, Connor and Oliver also start planning their wedding, which is seen through new flashforwards that reveal a new murder committed. Governor Birkhead is behind the witch-hunt against Annalise.

Season 6 (2019–20)

In May 2019 ABC ordered a sixth season of How to Get Away with Murder. In July it was announced the sixth season would be the last. Season 6 premiered on September 26, 2019.

Following Laurel and Christopher's disappearances and the death of Emmett Crawford at the previous season's end, Annalise goes on a bender and disappears into rehab out of guilt. After coming to terms with her past misdeeds, she returns just in time to help her remaining star students push through their final semester of law school and try and find Laurel and Christopher. Meanwhile, Michaela, Connor, and Asher continue to search for their friend and her son while preparing for graduation and the real world. However, everyone comes on high alert when the FBI, at behest of Governor Birkhead, open an investigation into Annalise, her students, and her associates, and every murder and misdeed over the last six seasons is put out in the open, forcing them to make drastic choices for survival that will change their lives, relationships, and futures forever.

Cast and characters

 Viola Davis as Annalise Keating, a prominent criminal defense attorney and law professor at Middleton University, whose life has been filled with trauma.
 Billy Brown as Nate Lahey, a Philadelphia police detective who at the beginning of the series is having an affair with Annalise.
 Alfred Enoch as Wes Gibbins (seasons 1–3; guest seasons 4 & 6), a law student and a member of Annalise's group of favored studentsthe so-called Keating 5and about whom she feels especially protective. Enoch also played Christopher Castillo, Wes and Laurel's son, in the series finale.
 Jack Falahee as Connor Walsh, a cunning and hard-working member of the Keating 5 whose confident and seductive "alpha gay" exterior obscures his insecurities.
 Katie Findlay as Rebecca Sutter (season 1; guest season 2), Wes' neighbor.
 Aja Naomi King as Michaela Pratt, a high-flying overachiever and a member of the Keating 5 who is determined to make a success of her life.
 Matt McGorry as Asher Millstone, a member of the Keating 5 from a privileged WASP background who feels left out of the group.
 Karla Souza as Laurel Castillo (seasons 1–5; recurring season 6), a resourceful Keating 5 member whose distant, wealthy father is the kingpin of an organized crime empire.
 Charlie Weber as Frank Delfino, Annalise's fixer and private detective.
 Liza Weil as Bonnie Winterbottom, Annalise's associate and right-hand woman, whose childhood and early adulthood were filled with horrifying events.
 Conrad Ricamora as Oliver Hampton (seasons 3–6; recurring seasons 1–2), a talented computer hacker whom Connor seduces and later marries.
 Rome Flynn as Gabriel Maddox (seasons 5–6; guest season 4), a mysterious young man and aspiring civil rights lawyer who arrives at Middleton University eager to investigate Annalise and the Keating 5.
 Amirah Vann as Tegan Price (seasons 5–6; recurring season 4), a powerful attorney at Caplan & Gold, the firm representing Laurel's father, who develops feelings for Annalise.
 Timothy Hutton as Emmett Crawford (season 5), a managing partner at Caplan & Gold who develops an attraction towards Annalise.

Production

Development

On August 19, 2013, ABC bought from Shondaland Productions the original concept, produced by Shonda Rhimes and Betsy Beers. The script for the pilot episode was written by Grey's Anatomy supervising producer Peter Nowalk. ABC ordered the pilot on December 19, 2013. On May 8, 2014, ABC picked up the pilot to series for the 2014–15 television season. At the Television Critics Association Press Tour in July 2014, it was announced that How to Get Away with Murder would be a limited series with only 15 or 16 episodes per season. The smaller size of episode count stems from the deal for the series star Viola Davis. On October 9, 2014, ABC picked up the series for a full season of 15 episodes.

The series was renewed for a second season on May 7, 2015, by ABC. The series was effectively confirmed as earning a second-season renewal for the 2015–16 season via a promo succeeding the first-season finale and an earlier statement by Viola Davis also confirming the renewal at the close of shooting for the first season. It would contain 15 episodes, like the previous season. Production began on May 21, 2015, with Shonda Rhimes announcing on Twitter that Peter Nowalk and his writers were in full swing mapping the second season. The table read for the premiere occurred on July 14, 2015, with the title of the episode being revealed at the same time. Entertainment Weekly reported on July 23, 2015, that the identity of Rebecca's killer would be revealed in the season premiere. A promotional poster was released over a month before the season premiere, on August 17, 2015.

The series was renewed for a third season on March 3, 2016, along with several other series by ABC. It was announced that the third season would premiere on September 22, 2016. Production began on May 27, 2016, when showrunner Peter Nowalk announced on Twitter that the writer staff were in full swing mapping and writing the third season. The table read for the premiere happened on July 6, 2016, with filming starting a week later. A promotional poster showcasing Viola Davis as Annalise Keating, was released on August 9, 2016. ABC released a promo for the third season on August 29, 2016.

The series was renewed for a fourth season on February 10, 2017, by ABC.

The series was renewed for a fifth season on May 11, 2018, by ABC, which premiered on September 27, 2018.

On May 10, 2019, the series was renewed for a sixth season which premiered on September 26, 2019. On July 11, 2019, it was reported that the sixth season would be the final season.

Writing
In an interview with Entertainment Weekly, showrunner Peter Nowalk talked about what would happen in the third season regarding Frank's disappearance; he commented: "Yes, I can see the three-piece suits and the hair product all falling apart. It's more what Frank feels about himself". When talking about the trust between Annalise and Frank, Nowalk said: "...Frank has two choices: To run away and hope she never catches him, just to cut bait; or he can try to win his way back. That's a long road". Charlie Weber commented on Frank's whereabouts as he said to Entertainment Weekly "I think he's hiding, and I think he's alone. If he does have a lifeline, I don't think it's Laurel".

Regarding Laurel, Nowalk said that Laurel's backstory with her family would be explored in the upcoming season, "I feel like it's very present. The promise of our show is that we won't dangle things out too long. The likelihood is yes. We've raised that question too many times not to answer it sooner than later". Michaela's backstory would also be explored as Nowalk said "We have so much to explore with her. Aja is so talented. I'm just excited to really delve into her personal life next year". Talking to The Hollywood Reporter, Nowalk stated that the series would explore both Annalise and Nate's relationship and both their families.

Casting
On January 21, 2014, Matt McGorry was the first to be announced as a regular cast member, playing a law student. Throughout February and March 2014, other roles were announced as cast: Aja Naomi King, Jack Falahee, Alfred Enoch and Karla Souza as law students; Katie Findlay as a drug-dealing student; Charlie Weber as a law associate to Professor Keating; Billy Brown as Professor Keating's extra-marital love interest; veteran actor and producer Tom Verica as Professor Keating's husband; and Liza Weil as one of the professor's two associates.

On February 25, 2014, it was announced that Shonda Rhimes had cast Viola Davis in the series' leading role of Professor Annalise Keating. On August 11, 2014, it was announced that Orange is the New Black alum Alysia Reiner had joined the cast as a prosecutor who would be going up against Annalise. On November 4, 2014, it was announced that Oscar winner Marcia Gay Harden had joined the cast in the second half of the first season for a recurring role. On December 15, 2014, it was announced that Oscar nominee and Emmy winner Cicely Tyson would appear in an episode in the second half of the season.

It was announced on July 14, 2015, that the second season would introduce several new characters, including a family consisting of Caleb, Catherine and Helena Hapstall. Katie Findlay would return to play the character Rebecca Sutter, who was killed in the first-season finale. On July 22, 2015, it was announced that Kendrick Sampson, known from The Vampire Diaries would join the cast in the second season and be introduced in the season premiere. On July 31, 2015, it was announced that Famke Janssen had joined the cast as a brilliant, revered defense attorney for a multi-episode arc and would first appear in the season premiere.

Matt Cohen was announced on August 11, 2015, to recur in the second season as Levi Wescott, who is described as a sexy, edgy working class guy. On August 31, 2015, Variety reported that Amy Okuda would play a recurring role, but details on Okuda's part were being kept under wraps. Sherri Saum was announced to have been cast as a guest star on September 30, 2015. On January 14, 2016, it was announced that Wilson Bethel, Adam Arkin, and Roxanne Hart would be joining the series to play the Mahoney family. Bethel would play Charles Mahoney, the Ivy League-educated son, with Arkin playing his father Wallace and Hart playing his mother Sylvia.

After the second-season finale, it was announced that Dexter alum Lauren Vélez had joined the cast in a recurring role as the President of Middleton University. The role was described as "self-assured, friendly, warm and diplomatic". On August 6, 2016, it was announced that Esai Morales and Amy Madigan had joined the cast as guest stars for the third season. Deadline announced on August 31, 2016, that Mary J. Blige had landed a guest role in the third season.

On June 7, 2018, it was announced that Rome Flynn, who made a cameo appearance as Gabriel Maddox at the end of the fourth-season finale, was promoted to regular status for the upcoming fifth season. On July 18, it was reported that Amirah Vann, who recurred as Tegan Price during the fourth season, would also join the regular cast for the fifth season. On July 30, 2018, it was announced that Timothy Hutton had joined the main cast for the fifth season.

Filming
The pilot episode was filmed in Los Angeles, California, at the University of Southern California; in Philadelphia, Pennsylvania; in Bryn Mawr, Pennsylvania, at Bryn Mawr College; and in Collegeville, Pennsylvania, at Ursinus College. It was directed by Michael Offer. Production began on May 21, 2015, with Shonda Rhimes announcing on Twitter that Peter Nowalk and his writers were in full swing mapping the second season. The table read for the premiere occurred on July 14, 2015, with the title of the episode being revealed at the same time.

Reception

Critical response

The first season of How to Get Away with Murder received positive reviews, with most praising Viola Davis' performance. On Rotten Tomatoes, it has an approval rating of 85% based on 56 reviews, with an average rating of 7.11/10. The site's critical consensus reads, "How to Get Away with Murder isn't conceptually original, but it delivers thrills with melodramatic twists and a captivating lead". Metacritic gave the first season a score of 68 out of 100, based on 30 critics, indicating "generally favorable reviews".

Mary McNamara from Los Angeles Times wrote about Viola Davis' performance: "...all eyes are on Davis, Tony winner and Oscar nominee. Magnetic and intimidating, Davis creates an implacable surface beneath which shimmers all manner of fleet and startled emotions. Desire and fear, certainty, self-doubt and resolve are conjured in an instant with the angle of a glance, the lowering of an eyelid and then released as if they were never there". Entertainment Weeklys Melissa Maerz described Davis' performance as "powerfully layered". David Hinckle, from New York Daily News, said that the series does not serve up enough fun unlike Rhimes' other series, Grey's Anatomy and Scandal. Frazier Moore, Associated Press, wrote that the series "promises to be twisty, wicked, dark and fun. And it stars Viola Davis, who brings life to a character of endless calculations and mystery".

The second season also received positive reviews. On Rotten Tomatoes, it has an approval rating of 93% based on 87 reviews, with an average rating of 8.19/10. The site's critical consensus reads: "Developing a stronger narrative this season, How to Get Away with Murder throws more improbable shocks and higher stakes into the mix, adding preposterous fuel to an addictive fire". Lesley Brock, Paste Magazine, praised the second season writing: "I would not put it past How to Get Away with Murder, which has turned all other ABC show plot lines upside down on their heads and shown that nothing is impossible, to throw incest into an already haphazard mix". Brock gave the season a score of 9 out of 10. Kyle Anderson, Entertainment weekly, wrote that with Davis at the front the series can get away with anything.

The third season, once again, also received positive reviews. On Rotten Tomatoes, it has a rating of 90% based on 30 reviews, with an average rating of 7.52/10. The site's critical consensus reads: "Tense and taut, How to Get Away with Murder continues to step-up its game."

Critics' top ten lists

Ratings

The series pilot on September 25 set a record for DVR playback viewers with 6million, surpassing the January 27, 2014, record of 5.6million set by the pilot of The Blacklist. The series premiere had more than 14million viewers on live broadcast, and over 20million with DVR.

Accolades
 
The first season of the series was awarded Television Program of the Year by the American Film Institute and won Outstanding Drama Series at the 46th NAACP Image Awards and 26th GLAAD Media Awards. The series was also nominated for Favorite New TV Drama at the 41st People's Choice Awards and TV Drama of the Year at the GALECA awards. In 2016 the second season was nominated for Outstanding Drama Series at the 47th NAACP Image Awards, Favorite Network TV Drama at the 42nd People's Choice Awards and Outstanding Drama Series at the 27th GLAAD Media Awards.
 
Viola Davis became the first black woman to win a Primetime Emmy Award for Outstanding Lead Actress in a Drama Series, also winning two Screen Actors Guild Awards for Outstanding Performance in a Drama Series and the NAACP Image Awards for Outstanding Actress in a Drama Series. Davis also received nominations from the Golden Globe Awards for Best Actress in a Television Series, the Critics' Choice Awards for Best Actress in a Drama Series, and the Television Critics Association at the TCA Awards for Individual Achievement in Drama. Other cast members have also received recognition for their performances, with Alfred Enoch and Aja Naomi King being nominated by the NAACP as Outstanding Supporting Actor in a Drama Series and Outstanding Supporting Actress in a Drama Series at the NAACP Image Awards. Cicely Tyson was nominated five times for Outstanding Guest Actress at the Primetime Emmy Awards for her work on the series. Glynn Turman was nominated for Outstanding Guest Actor at the 2019 Primetime Emmy Awards.

Broadcast
How to Get Away with Murder airs on Thursdays at 10:00 p.m., Eastern Time. ABC pushed Grey's Anatomy and Scandal to 8 p.m. and 9 p.m., creating an all-night block of Shonda Rhimes–produced dramas airing on Thursdays, a rarity in American television. It was announced on July 14, 2014, that the series would debut September 25, 2014. In Canada, the series airs with sim-subbing of advertising in same timeslot on CTV, though it airs three hours earlier before the original ABC timeslot in the Atlantic Time Zone on CTV Atlantic in the Maritime Provinces.

The UK premiere of the series aired on Universal Channel on October 17, 2014.

The series also began airing on TV2 in New Zealand, 13th Street in Denmark, and the Seven Network in Australia on February 10, 2015. In Australia, the series moved to 7flix from the second half of the second season onwards and like in the US, airs in a programming block dedicated to Shonda Rhimes-produced dramas including Grey's Anatomy and Scandal.

In Sri Lanka, Malaysia, Philippines, Singapore, Hong Kong, Thailand and Indonesia the series airs on Sony Channel Asia within 12 hours of its original broadcast. In India, it airs on Star World Premiere.

Home media
Seasons 1 and 2 have been released on DVD, and Netflix currently streams all six seasons where available (each season is added a month after its finale under their agreement with ABC Studios). The last five episodes aired on ABC are carried on Hulu the day after their premiere. Additionally, seasons, episodes and the entire series are purchasable from most online video retailers.
Season 1
The first season DVD was first released in Region 1 on August 4, 2015.

Season 2
The second season DVD was first released in Region 1 on June 21, 2016.

References

External links

 
 

 
2010s American college television series
2010s American workplace drama television series
2010s American legal television series
2010s American LGBT-related drama television series
2010s American mystery television series
2014 American television series debuts
2020 American television series endings
2020s American college television series
2020s American workplace drama television series
2020s American legal television series
2020s American LGBT-related drama television series
2020s American mystery television series
American Broadcasting Company original programming
English-language television shows
GLAAD Media Award-winning shows
Nonlinear narrative television series
Murder in television
Primetime Emmy Award-winning television series
Serial drama television series
Television series by ABC Studios
Television series by Shondaland
Television shows filmed in Los Angeles
Television shows set in Philadelphia
Transgender-related television shows